Limonium zeraphae is a species of plants in the family Plumbaginaceae (leadworts). It is endemic to Malta.

Sources

References 

Endemic flora of Malta
zeraphae
Taxa named by Salvatore Brullo
Flora of Malta